Portage la Prairie is a small city in Manitoba, Canada.

Portage la Prairie may also refer to the following entities in Manitoba:

 Portage la Prairie (electoral district)
 Portage la Prairie (provincial electoral district)
 Portage la Prairie Airport (disambiguation)
 Rural Municipality of Portage la Prairie

See also